Castolus or Kastolos was a town of ancient Lydia. Xenophon says that king Darius II appointed his son Cyrus the Younger, commander of all the forces that muster at the plain of Castolus (Castoli Campus; Καστωλοῦ πεδίον).

The site of the plain of Castolus is fixed as the Burçak Ovası; the site of the town is unknown.

References

Populated places in ancient Lydia
Former populated places in Turkey
Roman towns and cities in Turkey
Lost ancient cities and towns